In cricket, an umpire is a person who has the authority to make judgements on the field. There are two on-field umpires, who apply the laws, make all necessary decisions, and relay the decisions to the scorers.

The Bangladesh Premier League (BPL) is a professional league for Twenty20 cricket in Bangladesh, which has been held annually since its first season in 2012. In the eight seasons of the league, 26 umpires have officiated at least one BPL match. Of these, Masudur Rahman has officiated the most matches, serving as an umpire 71 times, while Raveendra Wimalasiri and  Shafiuddin Ahmed have officiated the fewest, each serving in one match of the 2017 season. The first match of the BPL, played between the Barisal Burners and Sylhet Royals, was umpired by Dave Orchard and Anisur Rahman. 13 of the umpires are of Bangladeshi, 5 are Pakistani, 4 are English, 3 are Sri Lankan and 1 South African. 12 umpires have served in only one season.

The list is initially organised by the number of matches as an umpire, and if the numbers are tied, the list is sorted by last name. This list is correct as of the end of the 2022 BPL season.

Key

First – Year of the first BPL match officiated
Last – Year of latest BPL match officiated
Matches – Number of matches officiated

BPL umpires

References

External links
BCB Site

Bangladesh Premier League lists